Brunellia ecuadoriensis is a species of plant in the Brunelliaceae family. It is endemic to Ecuador.  Its natural habitat is subtropical or tropical moist montane forests. It is threatened by habitat loss.

References

ecuadoriensis
Endemic flora of Ecuador
Endangered plants
Taxonomy articles created by Polbot